The Kızılırmak Delta is the delta of the Kızılırmak River, 40 km east of Samsun. It is the biggest wetland in the Black Sea Region  and is one of several internationally important Ramsar sites in Turkey on account of its rich bird and plant life. All of the first and second delta plains and most of the third delta plain is dominated by agriculture.

Lakes
Some of the lake water is eutrophic due to agricultural pollution.

Biology

Birds
White stork breed here and there are many other species such as: grey-headed swamphen and great white egret. There is a bird ringing station.

Reptiles 
Reptile species found in the delta are Greek tortoise, European pond turtle, Darevskia saxicola lizard, European green lizard, Balkan green lizard, slow worm, European cat snake, Caspian whipsnake, grass snake, dice snake, and horned viper.

Amphibians 
Of the nine species of amphibians found in the delta, two species are salamanders and seven species are frogs. The main species in the area are banded salamander (Triturus vittatus), rough salamander (Triturus karaelinii), toad (Bufo bufo), green toad (Bufo viridis), tree frog (Hyla arborea), earth frog, agile frog (Rana dalmatin), and Uludağ toad (Rana macrocnemis).

Fish
Small numbers of sturgeon have been observed in the estuary and may still attempt to migrate upstream.

Threats 
A 2020 study found both sewage and agricultural pollution in the channels. Gendarmes are stationed to prevent illegal hunting. Pumping of groundwater causes seawater intrusion.

Management
Some traditional practices help with the management: for example water buffalo and fishing boats help keep the connections between the lakes open.

History

Festivals included a stork feast, spring release of water buffaloes, and sheep breeding. Traditionally it is considered sinful to kill certain animals and plants always or at certain times of year. In 2016 it was inscribed in the tentative list of World Heritage Sites in Turkey.

References

Further reading
 Natural Protected Areas of the Wetland and Bird Paradise in the Kizilirmak Delta in Samsun: 2019-2023 Management Plan Environment Ministry

External links

 
 Wings over Wetlands Critical Site Network (CSN) Tool
 Nature Association
 Official video

See also
Water supply and sanitation in Turkey

Ramsar sites in Turkey
Nature reserves in Turkey
Important Bird Areas of Turkey
Landforms of Samsun Province
River deltas of Asia
Landforms of the Black Sea
World Heritage Tentative List for Turkey